is a leading House of Lords decision on the doctrine of frustration in English contract law.

Facts
Fibrosa was a textile company based in Wilno, Poland (today Vilnius, capital of Lithuania). In July 1939, it entered into a contract with Fairbairn, a British firm, to buy industrial machinery for its plant in Gdynia for £4,800. The contract was signed on 12 July 1939 and, the following week, Fibrosa made an advanced payment of £1,000. The machines were expected to arrive within three to four months.

On 1 September 1939, Poland was invaded by Nazi Germany. The United Kingdom declared war on Germany on 3 September, entering World War II. The following week, Fibrosa's agents contacted Fairbairn to request that the initial £1,000 payment be refunded as the contract's execution as "it is now quite evident that the delivery of the machines on order for Poland cannot take place". Fairbairn refused. On 1 May 1940, Fibrosa's agents initiated legal proceedings.

The lower courts sided with Fairbairn, based on the authority of Chandler v Webster (1904). This held that, where a contract had been frustrated by a supervening event, "the loss lies where it falls". As a result, sums paid or rights accrued under the contract before the frustrating event occurs cannot be reclaimed but that all obligations falling due after it are discharged. Consequently, the lower courts rejected Fibrosa's claim to recover the £1,000.

Judgment
The House of Lords found in favour of Fibrosa. Viscount Simon was critical of the Chandler case and found that it would apply only where there has been no failure of the consideration. However, in the circumstances, there was a failure of the consideration as Fibrosa had received none of the machinery ordered. This frustrated contract would not be subject the rule in the Chandler decision, and so Fibrosa would succeed.

Lord Wright said the claim was based on unjust enrichment.

Commentary
In essence, having decided that the contract was frustrated (as to continue would have been treasonable), the court held that the entire deposit was recoverable by Fibrosa, given the total absence of consideration from the English supplier.  However, this decision raised more questions: "What if some machinery had been delivered? What if Fairbain had invested heavily in plant and materials prior to the contract?". The UK Parliament recognised that this war against the Nazis would give rise to numerous similar claims so, with admirable speed, they enacted the Law Reform (Frustrated Contracts) Act 1943, which provided that:
 Monies paid out before frustration are recoverable afterwards.
 Monies due before frustration are no longer due afterwards.
 A party who has obtained a valuable benefit under the contract may have to pay for it if the court considers it just.
 A party who has incurred expenses in respect of the contract before the frustrating event may recover such expenses from the other party if the court considers it just.

See also
 Chandler v Webster
 Frustration in English law

References

External links
 Full text of decision from Bailii.org
 UNSW case summary

House of Lords cases
1942 in case law
English unjust enrichment case law
English frustration case law
1942 in British law